Tyrrhena Terra is a large area on Mars, centered south of the Martian equator and immediately northeast of the Hellas basin. It was named for a classic albedo feature of the planet and is in the Mare Tyrrhenum quadrangle of Mars. Tyrrhena Terra is typical of the southern Martian terrae, with heavily cratered highlands and other rugged terrain. It contains the large volcano Tyrrhena Patera, one of the oldest volcanoes on Mars. Its largest crater is Herschel. Licus Vallis and the Ausonia Montes are other major features in the region. Some channels and dunes are visible in Tyrrhena Terra, as shown in the images below.

Dunes
When there are perfect conditions for producing sand dunes, steady wind in one direction and just enough sand, a barchan sand dune forms. Barchans have a gentle slope on the wind side and a much steeper slope on the lee side where horns or a notch often forms.    Some of the dunes in the pictures above are barchans.  Barchan is a Russian term because this type of dune was first seen in the desert regions of Turkistan.

Columnar Jointing

Lava flows sometimes cool to form large groups of more-or-less equally sized columns.    These joints have been seen on Mars.

See also
 Climate of Mars
 Columnar jointing
 Geology of Mars
 Barchan

References

 Complex geology of two large impact craters in Tyrrhena Terra, Mars: Detailed analysis using MEX HRSC camera data

Further reading
Lorenz, R.  2014.  The Dune Whisperers.  The Planetary Report: 34, 1, 8-14
Lorenz, R., J. Zimbelman.  2014.  Dune Worlds:  How Windblown Sand Shapes Planetary Landscapes. Springer Praxis Books / Geophysical Sciences.

Terrae on Mars
Mare Tyrrhenum quadrangle